The 1982 West Virginia Mountaineers football team represented West Virginia University in the 1982 NCAA Division I-A football season. It was the Mountaineers' 90th overall season and they competed as a Division I-A Independent. The team was led by head coach Don Nehlen, in his third year, and played their home games at Mountaineer Field in Morgantown, West Virginia. They finished the season with a record of nine wins and three losses (9–3 overall) and with a loss against Florida State in the Gator Bowl.

Schedule

Roster

Season recap

Jeff Hostetler was the starting quarterback for the Mountaineers. He led the team with 1916 passing yards and 10 touchdowns. Leading the team in rushing was Curlin Beck with 357 net yards. Darrell Miller led the team in receiving with 34 receptions for 565 yards.

The first game featured the Mountaineers against perennial powerhouse Oklahoma. Despite being a two touchdown plus underdog, the Mountaineers played a great game to upset the Sooners in Norman, 41–27. That was followed up with a 19–18 home victory over rival Mayland. The third game against Richmond, was a blowout, in which the Mountaineers won 43–10.

Their first loss of the season came to their hated rival, Pittsburgh, in the Backyard Brawl, by a score of 16–13. In the brawl, fans were introduced to All-American linebacker Darryl Talley. He intercepted a Dan Marino pass and blocked a punt for a safety in West Virginia's 16–13 loss to the No. 2-rated Panthers.
The 1982 game was one of just five times that both teams were nationally ranked: Pitt was rated No. 2 and West Virginia was 14th after upset wins over Oklahoma and Maryland.

The Mountaineers rebounded with a hard-fought 20–13 slugfest over Boston College, and quarterback Doug Flutie. WVU traveled to Blacksburg to take on rival Virginia Tech, in a game the Mountaineers won 16–6.

The next week, the Mountaineers hosted the number 1 team in the Nation, the Penn State Nittany Lions at home. WVU's offense never got rolling against the vaunted defense of Penn State, who pitched a 24–0 shutout. WVU rebounded once again with a blowout of its own against East Carolina, 30–3. The Mountaineers traveled to Philadelphia to take on Temple. The Owls lost 20–17.

West Virginia closed out the season with dominating wins over Rutgers, and Syracuse. That gave them a 9–2 record, a number 10 national ranking, and a trip to the Gator Bowl to take on Florida State.

Awards and honors
Darryl Talley, All-America selection

References

West Virginia
West Virginia Mountaineers football seasons
West Virginia Mountaineers football